Dr. Teeth and the Electric Mayhem or simply the Electric Mayhem is a Muppet musical group that debuted on the pilot for The Muppet Show in 1975. They are the house band for The Muppet Show, with personalities and appearances inspired by prominent real-life rock music and jazz performers. Following The Muppet Show, they appeared in various Muppet films and television specials and have also recorded album tracks and covered numerous songs.

Dr. Teeth and Animal were designed by Jim Henson, Zoot was designed by Bonnie Erickson, while the rest of the original band members were designed by Michael K. Frith. They made their debut in 1975's The Muppet Show: Sex and Violence, the pilot for The Muppet Show.

The band consists of Dr. Teeth on vocals and keyboards, Animal on drums, Floyd Pepper on vocals and bass, Janice on vocals and lead guitar and Zoot on saxophone. In season five of the show, Lips joined the band on trumpet. Animal, Floyd and Zoot also played in the Muppet Show pit band, performing the opening and closing themes and underscoring most of the Muppet Show performances. Lips and occasionally Janice appeared in the orchestra in later episodes. Though Lips made some appearances with the group after The Muppet Show ended production, the group later reverted to its original line-up. Also, the original pilot episode featured "Jim", a Muppet caricature of Jim Henson on banjo.

The band's first film role was performing the song "Can You Picture That?" in The Muppet Movie. They also performed "Night Life" and participated in "The Happiness Hotel" in The Great Muppet Caper and performed "Jingle Bell Rock" in A Muppet Family Christmas. They appeared in The Muppets Take Manhattan (sans Lips) where Dr. Teeth sang "You Can't Take No For An Answer". Following the deaths of two of the group's puppeteers, Jim Henson (Dr. Teeth) and Richard Hunt (Janice), they were limited to brief instrumental background music for years. However, Dr. Teeth and the Electric Mayhem backed Miss Piggy for a song in The Muppets' Wizard of Oz and performed alongside Miley Cyrus in the Studio DC: Almost Live television special. They have been a mainstay in the Muppets' viral video efforts of the 2010s and have (with Lips) a featured role on The Muppets as the house band on the show-within-a-show Up Late with Miss Piggy. In 2015, they released two music videos for "Jungle Boogie" (featuring Sam Eagle) and "Kodachrome".

An Electric Mayhem "live" tour with audio-animatronic versions of the puppets and rock band My Morning Jacket performing the characters was proposed by The Walt Disney Company but ultimately abandoned. The band performed a live five-song set at the Outside Lands Music and Arts Festival on August 6, 2016.

The Muppets Mayhem, a new series about the Electric Mayhem was ordered by Disney+ in March 2022. The series will be developed and written by Adam F. Goldberg, Bill Barretta and Jeff Yorkes and, Lilly Singh and Tahj Mowry will star.

Discography

Songs

Members

Current members

Dr. Teeth
 Performed by Jim Henson (1975–1990), John Kennedy (1991–2003), Bill Barretta (2005–present)
Dr. Teeth is the lead singer, keyboardist and gravelly-voiced leader of the band. He is green-skinned and red-haired with a large grinning mouth of teeth including a gold tooth supposedly fashioned by melting down his gold records. He sports a scruffy red beard with no mustache, a fur vest, a striped shirt and a floppy purple top hat. He has arms so long that additional puppeteers are required to guide them; this design enabled Henson to work the Dr. Teeth puppet while another performer acted as Dr. Teeth's hands in order to play the keyboard. His self-introduction in The Muppet Movie was typically grandiose: "Golden teeth and golden tones. Welcome to my presence." He often misuses long words and mangles verb conjugation. Jim Henson originally performed him, basing the character on New Orleans musician Dr. John. He was designed by Henson and Michael K. Frith and built by Don Sahlin. He debuted in The Muppet Show: Sex and Violence.

Dr. Teeth only sings lead vocals on the second Muppet pilot and during the first season and these songs were only written before Rowlf the Dog had become firmly established as the regular Muppet pianist. Later performances mostly feature lead vocals by Floyd or Janice and only a few featured Dr. Teeth. His speaking roles got even smaller after his performer Jim Henson's death; an exception was the 1991 Muppets stage show "Muppets on Location: Days of Swine and Roses", the voice being performed by John Kennedy. He performed Dr. Teeth from 1991 to 2003 but made only very brief appearances with very little dialogue, some examples being the 1999 film Muppets from Space and once in the music video for the We Are Family charity song in 2002. Bill Barretta took over the role beginning with The Muppets' Wizard of Oz so that Kennedy could start performing Floyd instead following the retirement of Jerry Nelson, Floyd's original performer (although Matt Vogel later assumed the role of Floyd as well as most of Nelson's primary Muppet characters). Dr. Teeth's first major speaking role since Henson's death was in Statler and Waldorf's very own show, Statler and Waldorf: From the Balcony where Victor Yerrid performed him. Bill Barretta, however, has been performing Dr. Teeth consistently since 2005.

Although being the band leader, Dr. Teeth is never featured in the regular orchestra playing at The Muppet Show like the rest of the group. Instead, Rowlf plays the piano in the orchestra pit.

Jim Henson once said that Dr. Teeth was one of the most difficult characters to play due to the harshness of the character's voice. Although he appeared in Muppet Treasure Island, he was absent from Muppets Tonight and did not appear in the first episode.

Animal

 Performed by Frank Oz (1975–2000), Eric Jacobson (2002–present)

Animal is the primitive wildman, drummer and the most published member of the band being the only member to appear in every feature film and the only member in the regular cast of the Muppet Babies spin-off cartoon. He is named for his wild behavior and drumming. Some speculate the character is based on either Keith Moon, John Bonham, Ginger Baker, or Levon Helm while others have suggested Mick Fleetwood. Several years ago, the famed Ludwig Drum Company built a specially modified version of their child-sized Ludwig Jr. kit for Animal, as noted on their website at the time.
In the April 8, 2002, episode of Inside the Actors Studio, Billy Joel claimed that Liberty DeVitto was the inspiration for the Muppets character Animal. This assertion has not been taken seriously as Animal's initial appearance in the 1974 pilot for The Muppet Show occurred two full years before DeVitto even made his first recording (on Joel's 1976 album Turnstiles). Others say there is no evidence that Animal was based on anyone specifically, and is simply an amalgam of common stereotypes about rock drummers.

Frank Oz performed Animal from his first appearance until 2000; in 2002 newcomer Eric Jacobson took over. In Muppet Babies, he was voiced by Howie Mandel (1984–1985) and by Dave Coulier (1986–1991). Animal was also played by Kevin Clash in Muppets Tonight and by Bill Barretta in MuppetFest (the first Muppet fan convention). Animal's drumming was performed by British jazz and big band drummer Ronnie Verrell. He has had numerous appearances on television in advertising and on a U.S. postage stamp.

Floyd Pepper
 Performed by Jerry Nelson (1975–2003; 2008), John Kennedy (2005–2006), Matt Vogel (2008–present)
Floyd Pepper is the bassist and backup singer. A laid back hippie with a pink body and long orange hair, he usually wore a green army cap or sometimes while in the pit, a slightly fancier cap of stiffer, glittery material and a red uniform with epaulets and ornate gold braid on the buttons. He plays his bass left-handed; and although he's been seen playing a variety of bass guitars over time, he appears to have settled for playing Fender basses. The character was played and voiced by Jerry Nelson until 2003. At this time, Nelson retired from performing most of his characters, citing health reasons and John Kennedy took over the role beginning with The Muppets' Wizard of Oz. Matt Vogel took over in A Muppets Christmas: Letters to Santa. Author Christopher Finch says that Floyd is most like Nelson and if there were a spin-off of The Muppet Show centering on his band, Floyd would probably emerge as the central figure. He was designed by Michael K. Frith and built by Dave Goelz. He debuted in The Muppet Show: Sex and Violence.

A battle of the egos occurs whenever he and Miss Piggy are on screen together as he loves to poke fun at her airs and graces. He's also somewhat arrogant, referring to himself in a Muppet Magazine article as one real cool dude and during The Muppet Show (season 1 episode 23) he says to Kermit the Frog: "Kermit, you are talking to Floyd Pepper! The hippest of the hip! I mean I have a room for life at the home of the chronically groovy!". His name and pink color are homages to the band Pink Floyd, and Sgt. Pepper's Lonely Hearts Club Band, the album by the Beatles. He appears backstage more often than the other band members.

Although Dr. Teeth is the leader, Floyd is the one who sings lead most often. Some of the songs he sang on The Muppet Show include: "New York State of Mind", "Ain't Misbehavin'", "While My Guitar Gently Weeps" and "50 Ways to Leave Your Lover". He has a close relationship with Janice and is Animal's close friend and handler. In books like The Case of The Missing Mother, by James Howe, Animal is practically Floyd's pet.

Floyd has declared himself to be an excellent songwriter—when the band briefly went on strike, one of his conditions was that he be allowed to write new theme music for the show—but with no apparent contradiction, admits that everyone hates his music. "If I didn't know I was a genius," he once declared, "I wouldn't listen to the trash I write."

Janice
 Performed by Fran Brill (1975–1976), John Lovelady (1975) Eren Ozker (1976), Richard Hunt (1975, 1977–1991), Matt Vogel (2000), Kevin Clash (2001), Brian Henson (2002–2003), Tyler Bunch (2005–2008), David Rudman (2008–present)
Janice is a guitarist and backup singer with a flower child personality. She has blonde hair, big eyelashes and lips, and usually wears a brown hat with a turquoise gem and a feather. Though she regularly performed vocals, she actually only sang lead a couple of times on the show. She also acted in sketches periodically, most notably as wisecracking Nurse Janice in 'Veterinarian's Hospital', a recurring parody of medical dramas; in the latter role, she dispenses with much of her flower child lingo. Her name is an homage to Janis Joplin. Janice is the band's lead guitarist and backup singer and she plays left-handed. Her favourite guitar is a Gibson Les Paul with cherry sunburst colour scheme.

Janice was involved with Zoot in the first season of The Muppet Show but paired up with Floyd Pepper at the start of season two. Janice was performed by Eren Ozker during the first season of The Muppet Show (without the valley-girl voice), then she was performed by Richard Hunt until his death in 1992. Briefly, in The Muppet Show pilot, in the Muppet Meeting Films and in one Season 1 sketch she was performed by Fran Brill. Due to the lack of female Muppet performers, Janice has, since Ozker's departure, consistently been played by a man.

Muppet characters are frequently paired together based on how well puppeteers perform as a team. Richard Hunt and Jerry Nelson had established themselves as a team prior to The Muppet Show. Therefore, the change in Janice's performer may have been the reason for her relationship shifting from Zoot to Floyd. After Hunt's death, her character was faded back to brief non-speaking background appearances until 2000's Muppet Race Mania in which she was performed by Matt Vogel. Brian Henson also provided her voice for It's a Very Merry Muppet Christmas Movie and the video game Muppets Party Cruise. In The Muppets' Wizard of Oz, she was performed by Tyler Bunch. Her most recent performer is David Rudman, who first performed her in Studio DC: Almost Live. John Lovelady performed her for one appearance in 1975.

A running gag in some Muppet movies was that during a scene in which several characters were excitedly talking at once and someone called for silence, Janice would be the last one still talking on a topic with no apparent connection to the situation. In The Muppets Take Manhattan: "So I told him 'Look, buddy, I don't take my clothes off for anybody, even if it is artistic,' and... Oh". Another example from The Great Muppet Caper, she says: "Look, Mother. It's my life. OK. So if I want to live on a beach and walk around naked... Oh".

Janice is the only member of the band apart from Animal to have appeared on the animated series Muppet Babies. In her single appearance, she was portrayed as slightly older than the main characters and able to read. She was voiced by Dave Coulier who regularly voiced baby versions of Animal, Bunsen Honeydew and Bean Bunny.

She bore a resemblance to Mary Travers of Peter, Paul and Mary.

Zoot
 Performed by Dave Goelz (1975–present)
Zoot is a teal-colored, balding saxophone player with dark glasses and a high-crowned blue felt hat and was generally a laid-back fellow of few words. His name refers to the 20th-century saxophonist Zoot Sims and per designer Bonnie Erickson is modeled after Latin jazz artist Gato Barbieri. He is performed by Dave Goelz. He was conceived as a burned-out, depressed 50-year-old musician but according to Goelz when the role was assigned to him, he did not know how to perform that type of character. He, therefore, made the character mainly communicate through his playing rather than by speaking.

Zoot spoke much more in the first season where he was often seen dancing with Janice in the "At the Dance" sketches. Goelz stated that he tried to give most of Zoot's lines away to other characters, particularly Floyd. Floyd's performer Jerry Nelson was not performing full-time in the first season which may explain Zoot originally having more dialogue. Since his eyes are hidden by his shades, he often appears oblivious to events around him—during the band's first meeting with Kermit the Frog and Fozzie Bear as depicted in The Muppet Movie, he briefly forgot his own name which Floyd described as Zoot "skip[ping] the groove again"—but he can be sharper than he seems. When Floyd declared the band to be "anklin'" during its brief strike, only Zoot seemed dubious, noting "The frog's been good to us."

Zoot's claim to fame was playing the final off-key note to the end theme of the show; he then looks into his saxophone with a bewildered expression, checks his music, gives a satisfied nod, looks around at the other musicians and gives the same nod. The note played is the lowest note on the baritone saxophone, while most of Zoot's other playing has the sound of a tenor saxophone and his instrument appears to be an alto saxophone.

In A Muppets Christmas: Letters to Santa, it's revealed that he celebrates Hanukkah.

Lips
 Performed by Steve Whitmire (1980–2016), Peter Linz (2017–present)
Lips joined the Electric Mayhem for several numbers during the final season of The Muppet Show, playing the trumpet. His name refers to the fact that trumpet players use their lips to play. He has yellow hair, goatee and a permanent squint. His appearances on the Muppet Show were few and far between and when he did appear in the later episodes or movies, he rarely did anything besides play the trumpet. One of his few speaking appearances was in the Shirley Bassey episode where he sang a line of "Barnyard Boogie."

He was mainly created so that Whitmire could have a character to perform in the band. His lack of character development was apparently due to Whitmire's uncertainty about performing Lips. He was less experienced as a puppeteer at the time and wanted to use a voice like Louis Armstrong but was afraid of offending African Americans. After The Muppet Christmas Carol, he was not seen at all until the NBC special Christmas in Rockefeller Center. He also appeared in the movie The Muppets. He also appeared and spoke (albeit very briefly) in the 2014 movie Muppets Most Wanted. He appears (and speaks on several occasions) in the new series The Muppets having been completely rebuilt, as the original puppet from his Muppet Show days disintegrated on set during the filming of the 2015 music video "Kodachrome".

Past members

Clifford
Clifford, performed by Kevin Clash, was briefly made a member of the Electric Mayhem (as a percussionist) in 1990. His only appearances with the group were in the television special The Muppets at Walt Disney World and minor publicity material.

Jim
Jim was featured in the original pilot episode as a Muppet caricature of Jim Henson on banjo.

In popular culture
 In Farscape: The Peacekeeper Wars (2004), after a confrontation with some Muppet-style aliens, Crichton makes a comment about "being shot at by the Electric Mayhem", the Muppet rock band.
 In an episode of Adult Swim's Robot Chicken (Season 1, Episode 4), Dr. Teeth and the Electric Mayhem were in a fake VH1 Behind the Music sketch detailing the band's activities after The Muppet Show. It shows Dr. Teeth earning a living as a piano teacher and claims that no one has seen Zoot since he was arrested in Japan for possessing a suitcase filled with thirty-seven pounds of hash – which is a parody of the 1980 Paul McCartney marijuana bust. Also, in a fake episode of The Howard Stern Show, Janice reveals that Tommy Lee gave her Hepatitis C and that she only has 5 years to live (referencing similar claims made by actress Pamela Anderson); when Stern ignores her distress and asks if Janice will show him her breasts; she angrily refuses. Finally, a possible comeback for the Electric Mayhem—a performance on Star Search—ends in tragedy when Animal has to be put down for a vicious attack on host Ed McMahon. The sketch ends with Floyd sadly stating that a reunion of the Electric Mayhem is impossible without Animal and Zoot as Dr. Teeth plays a piano duet with Rowlf the Dog and a sickly Janice coughs in the background.
 The Family Guy episode "Herpe the Love Sore" begins with Peter and Lois watching an episode of Behind the Music about the Electric Mayhem.

References

External links
 
 
 The 'Argentine' Muppet - Live from Waterloo

Fictional musical groups
The Muppets characters
Television characters introduced in 1975
American rock music groups
Musical groups established in 1975